The United States pay television content advisory system is a television content rating system developed cooperatively by the American pay television industry; it first went into effect on March 1, 1994, on cable-originated premium channels owned by the system's principal developers, Home Box Office, Inc. and Showtime Networks. The voluntary-participation system—developed to address public concerns about explicit sexual content, graphic violence and strong profanity that tend to be featured in pay-cable and pay-per-view programming—provides guidance to subscribers on the suitability of a program for certain audiences based on its content.

Used with standard age-based ratings issued per the Motion Picture Association film rating system and the TV Parental Guidelines, the system incorporates ten "content descriptors" (up to six of which can be used for an individual program) providing detailed information about the types of objectionable content contained in a motion picture or television program being aired on a particular service, including categories covering sexual content; different levels of violence, profanity and nudity; and a general-purpose category covering crude and mature humor, innuendo and/or the use of alcoholic beverages, tobacco products or drugs.

Like the TV Parental Guidelines, content ratings are determined by the individually participating pay television services. Ratings are applied to most original and acquired television series, theatrically released and made-for-cable films, documentaries and specials rated PG/TV-PG and above; they may also be applied to certain sporting events on general-entertainment-formatted pay services, primarily to account for fleeting expletives or other mild objectionable material that could occur during the broadcast. The ratings themselves have no legal force, and are not used during promotional advertisements. While bearing similarities to the content sub-ratings added to the TV Parental Guidelines in July 1997, the advisories in this system are relatively more succinct in ascribing the mature material incorporated into a program.

Similar content guidelines have since been introduced by regional pay television industries or individual pay services outside of the U.S. (including Canada, Asia and Latin America). Within the United States, Comedy Central—which operates as a basic cable channel—has assigned "Graphic Language" advisory indicators for content bumpers on select TV-MA-rated original series (including South Park and Workaholics).

Development and implementation
Prior to the system’s creation and implementation, premium television services did not provide on-air content advisories at the start of a film, television series or special to notify viewers of mature subject matter included in the accordant telecast; vague illustrations of the suitability of a program for minors under age 18, depending on the program content and rating, were made using the program rating (e.g., as used in bumpers shown on HBO and Cinemax from 1984 to 1986, "The following movie has been rated 'PG-13' by the Motion Picture Association of America. Some material may be inappropriate for young children; parents may wish to consider whether it should be viewed by those under 13."). Instead of showing on-air advisories, premium services chose to put content labels of relative detail (i.e., “violence, profanity”) in the synopses of program highlight insets and end-of-issue program summaries within the monthly program guides supplied to their subscribers.

Amid parental concerns regarding the amount of violent content featured in premium cable and other television programming, in January 1994, representatives from the pay-cable television industry voluntarily pledged to establish a content advisory system in order to provide information to parents about program content that may be unsuitable for their children. This became structured as a system derived from the advisories published in their proprietary program guides, assigning individual ratings corresponding to the types of objectionable content depicted in a given program (categorized based on violence, profanity, sexuality or miscellaneous forms of mature material inapplicable to the other categories). The initial system adopted by the pay services of Home Box Office, Inc. (HBO and Cinemax) and Showtime Networks (Showtime, The Movie Channel and Flix) on March 1, 1994, consisted strictly of descriptive text outlining the mature material included the following telecast; the cooperative members featured the indicators—which initially differed slightly between the two parent companies—in the rating bumpers immediately preceding each program.

On June 10, 1994, the Home Box Office and Showtime Networks services introduced a revised, uniform system: a set of block icons incorporating one of ten content codes—each two to three letters in length, and displayed in bold Fixedsys type—was added to supplement the applicable descriptive text, which was uniformally featured in a separate "page" of the rating bumper. (Since Home Box Office Inc. adopted the practice in 2015, most premium services—save for the Showtime Networks, which previously used the style from June 1994 to March 1995—have used a bumper format displaying the age-based rating, content advisories and audio/visual accessibility features on a single page.) Under the new system, each advisory label was placed into one of four categories: violence (“MV” for “mild violence”, “V” for “violence”, “GV” for “graphic violence” and “RP” for “rape”), suggestive or explicit sexual material (“BN” for brief nudity”, “N” for “nudity” and “SSC” for “strong sexual content”), profane language (“AL” for “adult language” and “GL” for “graphic language”) and a generalized descriptor for mature material that does not fit into the other categories (“AC” for “adult content”). Of the participating pay services, Showtime Networks was the only member in the cooperative to have its continuity announcers read the advisory ratings, in addition to the then-commonplace announcement of the program ratings, utilizing such announcements during ratings bumpers until the Fall of 1997.

Liberty Media-owned pay services Starz (which launched on April 1 of that year) and Encore soon followed in implementing the system by September 1994, and by early 1997, it was in use across several of the major pay-per-view services, including Viewer's Choice and Request TV. Since then, the system has also been implemented by Sundance Channel (until its conversion to a basic cable channel in 2008), MoviePlex, and Epix. HBO, Cinemax, Showtime and Starz also include content advisories at the start of on-demand program selections over their respective video-on-demand and OTT services;  exceptions are HBO's co-branded HBO Max streaming service (which uses a wider array of descriptors that specify material normally covered by the system's broad-based "Adult Content" indicator), Showtime's licensed subscription channels for Apple TV, The Roku Channel and Prime Video Channels (which instead use the generic descriptors created for the TV Parental Guidelines, used by the streaming marketplaces as a default advisory system, including for MPA-rated theatrical films), and Epix's VOD and streaming services (which do not use content advisory descriptors for on-demand titles, with the channel restricting their use to its live feeds).

Programs are labeled at the discretion of each pay television service’s parent unit; because of this, as an example, a film labeled by HBO and Cinemax with a "GV" (graphic violence) advisory rating could conceivably be labeled with a "V" rating (usually indicating a moderate amount of violent content) if it were to air on Showtime, The Movie Channel and Flix. McAdory Lipscomb, former executive vice president of Showtime, described about how the advisories are applied, "It is possible that [Showtime] would rank something different than HBO, but we both recognize our dual responsibility to provide information to our subscribers about what is graphic or perhaps unsuitable for children, and we think the common language we've developed will provide an acceptable parameter." A November 1996 survey conducted by the University of Wisconsin–Madison and sponsored by the National PTA and the Institute for Mental Health Initiatives showed that 80% of parents who participated in the survey preferred the pay television industry’s content advisory system, assessing that it provided clearer detail of potentially objectionable content included in an individual program compared to age-based ratings systems like the MPAA’s system for theatrical films.

Usage of advisory system
Cable-originated premium services can assign as many as five content indicators for an individual program to advise viewers of whether its content is appropriate for minors, depending on age group, or adults with particular sensitivities to certain kinds of mature content. (e.g., HBO/Cinemax assigned the unrated version of the 2010 comedy Get Him to the Greek—assigned a "TV-MA-L,S,V" rating by the services, but originally rated "R" for its theatrical release—indicators for adult content, for pervasive sexual dialogue, drug references, moderate alcohol and drug use, and crude humor; strong sexual content, for two separate scenes in which secondary lead character Aaron Green [Jonah Hill] had non-nude intercourse with different women, and had a dildo forcibly inserted orally and rubbed on his face; graphic language, for the film’s use of ~150 expletives; and nudity, for two scenes involving topless women and one that featured partially exposed male buttocks.)

Softcore pornographic films usually have been assigned advisory labels for strong sexual content (SC) and nudity (N), in addition to adult content (AC) and adult language (AL), although some, where included, have been tagged for violent content. Because they rarely include even mildly objectionable content fitting advisory criteria, premium services usually do not assign content labels for G-/TV-G-rated programs.

Advisory labels

Ratings-based usage
Note: Content advisories are not applied to TV-Y-rated programming, as the subject material for programs assigned with the rating is oriented mainly to young children up to seven years of age.

See also
Motion Picture Association film rating system
TV Parental Guidelines

References

Entertainment rating organizations
Media content ratings systems
Cable television in the United States
1994 introductions
1994 establishments in the United States
1994 in American television